The FIDE Grand Prix 2022 was a series of three chess tournaments played between 4 February and 4 April 2022. The top two finishers – Hikaru Nakamura (winner) and Richárd Rapport (runner-up) – qualified for the Candidates Tournament 2022, which is the final qualification stage for the World Chess Championship 2023. 

The first and last tournament took place in Berlin, Germany, and the second one in Belgrade, Serbia. Each player was scheduled to participate in two of three tournaments. Before the tie-break stage of the last tournament was concluded, Nakamura had already gained the score to win the series, and it was already clear that no other semi-finalist could overtake Rapport for the runner-up position.

Organization

Due to the travel restrictions imposed by the COVID-19 pandemic, all three tournaments were initially to be played in a single city instead of playing in various cities as in previous editions.

The series was organized by World Chess. The company chose Berlin to host most of the series following a popular vote. Later it was announced that two of the three tournaments would be in Berlin, with one in Belgrade, Serbia.

Players
Twenty-four players were originally invited to the Grand Prix:
 The players who placed third to eighth at the Chess World Cup 2021 who were not World Champion or already qualified for the Candidates. Five out of a possible six players qualified in this way, because World Champion Magnus Carlsen placed third in the World Cup.
 The players who placed third to eighth in the FIDE Grand Swiss Tournament 2021 who were not World Champion or already qualified for the Candidates or Grand Prix. Six players qualified in this way.
 Hikaru Nakamura, nominee of the FIDE president.
 Daniil Dubov, organizer's nominee.
 The remaining eleven places were filled by the top players in the December 2021 rating list so long as they had participated in the FIDE World Cup 2021 or played at least nine games which counted in the FIDE rating lists from February to December 2021. This meant Viswanathan Anand, Wang Hao, and Veselin Topalov were not eligible because of inactivity. The list originally went down to #23 in the world, though after Wei Yi withdrew, world #25 Pentala Harikrishna also qualified this way.

Ding Liren and Dmitry Andreikin were unable to compete in the first tournament due to health and visa issues respectively, and were replaced in the first tournament by Andrey Esipenko and Radosław Wojtaszek. Ding was also unable to play in the second tournament, and Andreikin took his place. Due to personal reasons, Andreikin also withdrew from the third tournament, and was replaced by Esipenko. The replacements Esipenko and Wojtaszek were eligible to qualify for the Candidates.

The table below shows the players who qualified for the Grand Prix:

Format
Each player will play in two out of three of the tournaments. Each tournament will have 16 players, and have a two-stage format.

 In the first stage, the players are divided into four pools of four, and the players in each pool play a double round-robin mini-tournament. The four winners of the pools progress to the second stage.
 In the second stage, the four pool winners play a knock-out tournament, consisting of semi-finals and a final. Both the semi-finals and final will consist of 2 classical time limit games, plus tie-breaks if required.

Players receive Grand Prix points according to their finishing position in each tournament. The two players with the most Grand Prix points qualify for the Candidates Tournament 2022.

Time controls and tie-breaks
The time control for classical games is 90 minutes for 40 moves, plus an extra 30 minutes after move 40. There is also an increment of 30 seconds per move from move 1.

In the pool stage, if there is a tie for first, the tied players play tie-breaks. In the knockout stage, tie-breaks are played if the match is tied after the 2 regular time limit games. In both stages, two-way or three-way tie-breaks take the following format:
 Players play two rapid chess games at 15 minutes plus 10 seconds per move. In the case of a three-way tie, a single round-robin is played.
 If players are still tied, they play two blitz chess games at 3 minutes plus 2 seconds per move. In the case of a three-way tie, a single round-robin is played.
 If players are still tied, a single armageddon chess game is played to decide the winner, in which black is declared the winner if the game is drawn. The time limit is 5 minutes for white, 4 minutes for black, and a 2 second per move increment from move 61. In the case of a three-way tie, lots are drawn to determine the players, and the loser of the lot shares second place with the loser of the Armageddon game.

In the case of a four-way tie, the players are randomly divided into pairs by drawing of lots and each pair plays a two-player tie-break by the above method. The two tie-break winners then play a tie-break by the above method, while the losers share third and fourth place in the pool.

Grand Prix points
Grand Prix points were awarded as follows:

In other words, the top three players in each pool earn 7, 4, and 2 points, respectively, and 3 additional points are awarded for winning a semifinal or final.

The Grand Prix points for pool placings take into account tie-breaks played to determine first place. Players tied for other places, including players who are still tied after tie-breaks have decided first place, share Grand Prix points.

If players finish tied on Grand Prix points, then the following tie-breaks are applied, in order:
 number of tournament first-place finishes;
 number of tournament second-place finishes;
 number of points scored in regular time limit games;
 number of wins in regular time limit games;
 drawing of lots.

Prize money
The prize money for each event is €150,000 which will be awarded as follows:

In other words, each player receives €5,000, Grand Prix points earned in the pool are worth an additional €1,000, and Grand Prix points earned in a semi-final or final are worth an additional €2,000.

Tournament 1 - Berlin, Germany
The first tournament was held in Berlin, Germany from 4 February to 17. Due to health and visa issues, Dmitry Andreikin and Ding Liren were replaced with Andrey Esipenko and Radoslaw Wojtaszek, respectively. Hikaru Nakamura won the first leg with Levon Aronian as the runner-up.

Round-robin stage

The double round-robin stage had the six rounds of standard time control games on 4–7, 9, and 10 February with tie-breaks on 11 February. Players in bold advanced to the knockout stage.

Pool A
{| class="wikitable"
|-
!Rank
!Player
!RatingDecember 2021
!colspan="2"|NAK
!colspan="2"|ESI
!colspan="2"|GRI
!colspan="2"|BAC
!Total Points
|-
|- align="center" style="background:white; color:black"
| 1||align="left"|
|2736
|style="background:lightgray" colspan="2"| 
| 1||style="background:black; color:white"| ½
| 1 || style="background:black; color:white" | ½
| ½|| style="background:black; color:white" | ½
| 4
|- align="center" style="background:white; color:black"
| 2||align="left"|
|2714
| ½||style="background:black; color:white"| 0
|style="background:lightgray" colspan="2"| 
| ½ ||style="background:black; color:white"| ½
| 1||style="background:black; color:white"| 1
| 3.5
|- align="center" style="background:white; color:black"
| 3||align="left"|
|2764
| ½||style="background:black; color:white"| 0
| ½||style="background:black; color:white"| ½
|style="background:lightgray" colspan="2"| 
| 1||style="background:black; color:white"| ½
| 3
|- align="center" style="background:white; color:black"
| 4|| align="left" |
|2642
| ½ ||style="background:black; color:white"| ½
| 0||style="background:black; color:white"| 0
| ½||style="background:black; color:white"| 0
|style="background:lightgray" colspan="2"| 
| 1.5
|}

Pool B
{| class="wikitable"
|-
!Rank
!Player
!RatingDecember 2021
!colspan="2"|RAP
!colspan="2"|WOJ
!colspan="2"|FED
!colspan="2"|OPA
!Total Points
!R1
!R2
!Tiebreak Points
|-
|- align="center" style="background:white; color:black"
| 1||align="left"|
|2763
|style="background:lightgray" colspan="2"| 
| ½|| style="background:black; color:white" | 0
| 1|| style="background:black; color:white" | 1
| ½||style="background:black; color:white"| ½
|3.5
| style="background:black; color:white" | 1
| style="background:white; color:black" | ½
|1.5
|- align="center" style="background:white; color:black"
| 2||align="left"|
|2686
| 1|| style="background:black; color:white" | ½
|style="background:lightgray" colspan="2"|
| ½|| style="background:black; color:white" | ½ 
| ½||style="background:black; color:white"| ½
|3.5
| style="background:white; color:black" | 0
| style="background:black; color:white" | ½
|0.5
|- align="center" style="background:white; color:black"
| 3||align="left"|
|2704
| 0|| style="background:black; color:white" | 0
| ½|| style="background:black; color:white" | ½
|style="background:lightgray" colspan="2"| 
| 1|| style="background:black; color:white" | 1
|3
| colspan="2" | -
| -
|- align="center" style="background:white; color:black"
| 4||align="left"|
|2681
| ½||style="background:black; color:white"| ½
| ½||style="background:black; color:white"| ½
| 0||style="background:black; color:white"| 0
|style="background:lightgray" colspan="2"| 
|2
| colspan="2" | -
| -
|}

Pool C
{| class="wikitable"
|-
!Rank
!Player
!RatingDecember 2021
!colspan="2"|ARO
!colspan="2"|GUJ
!colspan="2"|DUB
!colspan="2"|KEY
!Total Points
|-
|- align="center" style="background:white; color:black"
| 1||align="left"|
|2772
|style="background:lightgray" colspan="2"| 
| 1||style="background:black; color:white"|½
| ½|| style="background:black; color:white" | ½
| 1||style="background:black; color:white"|1 
| 4.5
|- align="center" style="background:white; color:black"
| =2||align="left"|
|2727
| ½|| style="background:black; color:white" | 0
|style="background:lightgray" colspan="2"| 
| 1||style="background:black; color:white"| ½
| ½||style="background:black; color:white"| ½
| 3
|- align="center" style="background:white; color:black"
| =2|| align="left" |
|2720
| ½||style="background:black; color:white"|½ 
| ½||style="background:black; color:white"| 0
|style="background:lightgray" colspan="2"| 
| 1|| style="background:black; color:white" | ½
|3
|- align="center" style="background:white; color:black"
| 4|| align="left" |
|2664
| 0||style="background:black; color:white"| 0
| ½||style="background:black; color:white"| ½
| ½|| style="background:black; color:white" |0
|style="background:lightgray" colspan="2"| 
|1.5
|}

Pool D
{| class="wikitable"
|-
!Rank
!Player
!RatingDecember 2021
!colspan="2"|DOM
!colspan="2"|WSO
!colspan="2"|HAR
!colspan="2"|SHI
!Total Points
!R1
!R2
!Tiebreak Points
|-
|- align="center" style="background:white; color:black"
| 1||align="left"|
|2752
|style="background:lightgray" colspan="2"| 
| 0|| style="background:black; color:white" | ½
| ½|| style="background:black; color:white" | 1
| 1|| style="background:black; color:white" | 1
| 4
| style="background:black; color:white" | ½
| style="background:white; color:black" | 1
| 1.5
|- align="center" style="background:white; color:black"
| 2||align="left"|
|2772
| ½|| style="background:black; color:white" | 1
|style="background:lightgray" colspan="2"| 
| ½|| style="background:black; color:white" | ½
| 1|| style="background:black; color:white" | ½ 
| 4
| style="background:white; color:black" | ½
| style="background:black; color:white" | 0
| 0.5
|- align="center" style="background:white; color:black"
| 3||align="left"|
|2717
| 0|| style="background:black; color:white" | ½
| ½|| style="background:black; color:white" | ½
|style="background:lightgray" colspan="2"| 
| ½|| style="background:black; color:white" | ½
| 2.5
| colspan="2" | -
| -
|- align="center" style="background:white; color:black"
| 4||align="left"|
|2704
| 0|| style="background:black; color:white" | 0
| ½|| style="background:black; color:white" | 0
| ½|| style="background:black; color:white" | ½
|style="background:lightgray" colspan="2"| 
| 1.5
| colspan="2" | -
| -
|}

Knockout stage

Semi-final 1
{| class="wikitable"
!Seed!!Name!!December 2021 rating!!1!!2!!Total Points
|- align=center
| 10
| align=left | 
| 2736
| style="background:white; color:black" | 1
| style="background:black; color:white" | ½
|1.5
|- align=center
| 7
| align=left | 
| 2763
| style="background:black; color:white" | 0
| style="background:white; color:black" |½
|0.5
|}

Semi-final 2
{| class="wikitable"
!Seed!!Name!!December 2021 rating!!1!!2!!Total Points
|- align=center
| 2
| align=left | 
| 2772
| style="background:white; color:black" | 1
| style="background:black; color:white" | ½
| 1.5
|- align=center
| 9
| align=left | 
| 2752
| style="background:black; color:white" | 0
| style="background:white; color:black" |½
| 0.5
|}

Final
{| class="wikitable"
!Seed!!Name!!December 2021 rating!!1!!2!!R1!!R2!!Total Points
|- align=center
| 10
| align=left | 
| 2736
| style="background:white; color:black" | ½
| style="background:black; color:white" | ½
| style="background:white; color:black" | 1
| style="background:black; color:white" | 1
|3
|- align=center
| 2
| align=left | 
| 2772
| style="background:black; color:white" | ½
| style="background:white; color:black" | ½
| style="background:black; color:white" | 0
| style="background:white; color:black" | 0
|1
|}

Tournament 2 - Belgrade, Serbia
The second tournament was held in Belgrade, Serbia from 1 to 14 March. Russian players' flags are displayed as the FIDE flag due to FIDE's decision to ban Russian and Belarusian flags from being displayed at FIDE-rated events in response to the 2022 Russian invasion of Ukraine. Richárd Rapport won the second leg of the 2022 Grand Prix with Dmitry Andreikin as the runner-up.

Round-robin stage

The double round-robin stage had six rounds of standard time control games on 1–4, 6, and 7 March with tie-breaks on 8 March. Players in bold advanced to the knockout stage.

Pool A
{| class="wikitable"
|-
!Rank
!Player
!RatingMarch 2022
!colspan="2"| AND
!colspan="2"| SHA
!colspan="2"| BAC
!colspan="2"| GRI
!Total Points
|-
|- align="center" style="background:white; color:black"
| 1||align="left"| 
|2724
|style="background:lightgray" colspan="2"| 
| ½||style="background:black; color:white"| ½
| 1|| style="background:black; color:white" | ½
| ½|| style="background:black; color:white" | 1
| 4
|- align="center" style="background:white; color:black"
| 2||align="left"| 
| 2704
| ½||style="background:black; color:white"| ½
|style="background:lightgray" colspan="2"| 
| ½||style="background:black; color:white"| ½
| 1||style="background:black; color:white"| ½
| 3.5
|- align="center" style="background:white; color:black"
| 3||align="left"| 
| 2635
| ½||style="background:black; color:white"| 0
| ½||style="background:black; color:white"| ½
|style="background:lightgray" colspan="2"| 
| ½||style="background:black; color:white"| ½
| 2.5
|- align="center" style="background:white; color:black"
| 4|| align="left" | 
| 2758
| 0||style="background:black; color:white"| ½
| ½||style="background:black; color:white"| 0
| ½||style="background:black; color:white"| ½
|style="background:lightgray" colspan="2"| 
| 2
|}

Pool B
{| class="wikitable"
|-
!Rank
!Player
!RatingMarch 2022
!colspan="2"| GIR
!colspan="2"| VIT
!colspan="2"| TAB
!colspan="2"| HAR
!Total Points
|-
|- align="center" style="background:white; color:black"
| 1||align="left"| 
| 2771
|style="background:lightgray" colspan="2"|
| 1|| style="background:black; color:white" | ½
| 1|| style="background:black; color:white"| ½
| ½|| style="background:black; color:white" | ½
| 4
|- align="center" style="background:white; color:black"
| =2||align="left"| 
|2726
| ½|| style="background:black; color:white" | 0
|style="background:lightgray" colspan="2"| 
| ½|| style="background:black; color:white"| ½
| ½|| style="background:black; color:white" | 1
| 3
|- align="center" style="background:white; color:black"
| =2||align="left"| 
|2623
| ½|| style="background:black; color:white" | 0
| ½|| style="background:black; color:white" | ½
|style="background:lightgray" colspan="2"| 
| ½|| style="background:black; color:white" | 1
| 3
|- align="center" style="background:white; color:black"
| 4||align="left"| 
| 2716
| ½||style="background:black; color:white"| ½
| 0||style="background:black; color:white"| ½
| 0||style="background:black; color:white"| ½
|style="background:lightgray" colspan="2"| 
| 2
|}

Pool C
{| class="wikitable"
|-
!Rank
!Player
!RatingMarch 2022
!colspan="2"|RAP
!colspan="2"|GUJ
!colspan="2"|SHI
!colspan="2"|FED
!Total Points
|-
|- align="center" style="background:white; color:black"
| 1||align="left"| 
|2762
|style="background:lightgray" colspan="2"| 
| 1|| style="background:black; color:white" | 1
| ½||style="background:black; color:white"| ½
| ½||style="background:black; color:white"| ½
| 4
|- align="center" style="background:white; color:black"
| 2||align="left"| 
|2723
| 0||style="background:black; color:white"| 0
|style="background:lightgray" colspan="2"| 
| 1||style="background:black; color:white"| ½
| 1|| style="background:black; color:white" | ½
| 3
|- align="center" style="background:white; color:black"
| =3|| align="left" | 
|2691
| ½||style="background:black; color:white"| ½
| ½||style="background:black; color:white"| 0
|style="background:lightgray" colspan="2"| 
| 1|| style="background:black; color:white" | 0
| 2.5
|- align="center" style="background:white; color:black"
| =3|| align="left" | 
|2704
| ½||style="background:black; color:white"| ½
| ½||style="background:black; color:white"| 0
| 1|| style="background:black; color:white" | 0
|style="background:lightgray" colspan="2"| 
| 2.5
|}

Pool D
{| class="wikitable"
|-
!Rank
!Player
!RatingMarch 2022
!colspan="2"|MVL
!colspan="2"|MAM
!colspan="2"|PRE
!colspan="2"|YAN
!Total Points
|- align="center" style="background:white; color:black"
| 1||align="left"| 
|2761
|style="background:lightgray" colspan="2"| 
| ½|| style="background:black; color:white" | ½
| ½|| style="background:black; color:white" | 1
| ½|| style="background:black; color:white" | ½
| 3.5
|- align="center" style="background:white; color:black"
| =2||align="left"| 
| 2776
| ½|| style="background:black; color:white" | ½
|style="background:lightgray" colspan="2"| 
| ½|| style="background:black; color:white" | ½
| ½|| style="background:black; color:white" | ½
| 3
|- align="center" style="background:white; color:black"
| =2||align="left"|
|2682
| 0|| style="background:black; color:white" | ½
| ½|| style="background:black; color:white" | ½
|style="background:lightgray" colspan="2"| 
| ½|| style="background:black; color:white" | 1
| 3
|- align="center" style="background:white; color:black"
| 4||align="left"|
|2713
| ½|| style="background:black; color:white" | ½
| ½|| style="background:black; color:white" | ½
| 0|| style="background:black; color:white" | ½
|style="background:lightgray" colspan="2"| 
| 2.5
|}

Knockout stage

Semi-final 1
{| class="wikitable"
!Seed!!Name!!March 2022 rating!!1!!2
!R1
!R2!!Total Points
|- align=center
| 13
| align=left | 
| 2724
| style="background:black; color:white" | ½
| style="background:white; color:black" | ½
| style="background:white; color:black" | ½
| style="background:black; color:white" | 1
| 2.5
|- align=center
| 3
| align=left | 
| 2771
| style="background:white; color:black" | ½
| style="background:black; color:white" | ½
| style="background:black; color:white" | ½
| style="background:white; color:black" | 0
| 1.5
|}

Semi-final 2
{| class="wikitable"
!Seed!!Name!!March 2022 rating!!1!!2
!Total Points
|- align=center
| 7
| align=left | 
| 2762
| style="background:white; color:black" | 1
| style="background:black; color:white" | ½
| 1.5
|- align=center
| 8
| align=left |  
| 2761
| style="background:black; color:white" | 0
| style="background:white; color:black" | ½
| 0.5
|}

Final
{| class="wikitable"
!Seed!!Name!!March 2022 rating!!1!!2!!Total Points
|- align=center
| 13
| align=left | 
| 2724
| style="background:white; color:black" | ½
| style="background:black; color:white" | 0
| 0.5
|- align=center
| 7
| align=left | 
| 2762
| style="background:black; color:white" | ½
| style="background:white; color:black" | 1
| 1.5
|}

Tournament 3 - Berlin, Germany

The third tournament was held in Berlin, Germany from 22 March to 4 April. Due to personal reasons, Dmitry Andreikin withdrew from the third leg and was replaced by Andrey Esipenko. Wesley So won the third leg with Hikaru Nakamura as the runner-up.

Round-robin stage
The double round-robin stage had six rounds of standard time control games on 22–25, 27, and 28 March with tie-breaks on 29 March. Winners advanced to the knockout stage between March 30–April 4, 2022.

Pool A 
{| class="wikitable"
|-
!Rank
!Player
!RatingMarch 2022
!colspan="2"|NAK
!colspan="2"|OPA
!colspan="2"|ARO
!colspan="2"|ESI
!Total Points
|-
|- align="center" style="background:white; color:black"
| 1||align="left"|
|2750
|style="background:lightgray" colspan="2"| 
| 1|| style="background:black; color:white" | ½
| 1|| style="background:black; color:white" | 0
| ½|| style="background:black; color:white" | 1
| 4
|- align="center" style="background:white; color:black"
| 2||align="left"|
|2674
| ½|| style="background:black; color:white" | 0
|style="background:lightgray" colspan="2"| 
| 1|| style="background:black; color:white" | ½
| 1|| style="background:black; color:white" | ½
| 3.5
|- align="center" style="background:white; color:black"
| 3||align="left"|
|2785
| 1|| style="background:black; color:white" | 0
| ½|| style="background:black; color:white" | 0
|style="background:lightgray" colspan="2"| 
| 1|| style="background:black; color:white" | ½
| 3
|- align="center" style="background:white; color:black"
| 4||align="left"|
|2723
| 0|| style="background:black; color:white" | ½
| ½|| style="background:black; color:white" | 0
| ½|| style="background:black; color:white" | 0
|style="background:lightgray" colspan="2"| 
| 1.5
|}

Pool B 
{| class="wikitable"
|-
!Rank
!Player
!RatingMarch 2022
!colspan="2"|MAM
!colspan="2"|KEY
!colspan="2"|DOM
!colspan="2"|DUB
!Total Points
!R1
!R2
!B1
!B2
!Tiebreak Points
|-
|- align="center" style="background:white; color:black"
| 1||align="left"|
|2776
|style="background:lightgray" colspan="2"| 
| 1|| style="background:black; color:white" | ½
| ½|| style="background:black; color:white" | ½
| ½|| style="background:black; color:white" | ½
| 3.5
| 1
| style="background:black; color:white" | 0
| style="background:black; color:white" | 1
| 1
| 3
|- align="center" style="background:white; color:black"
| 2||align="left"|
|2655
| ½|| style="background:black; color:white" | 0
|style="background:lightgray" colspan="2"| 
| 1|| style="background:black; color:white" | ½
| 1|| style="background:black; color:white" | ½
| 3.5
| style="background:black; color:white" | 0
| 1
| 0
| style="background:black; color:white" | 0
| 1
|- align="center" style="background:white; color:black"
| 3||align="left"|
|2756
| ½|| style="background:black; color:white" | ½
| ½|| style="background:black; color:white" | 0
|style="background:lightgray" colspan="2"| 
| ½|| style="background:black; color:white" | 1
| 3
| colspan="4" | -
| -
|- align="center" style="background:white; color:black"
| 4||align="left"|
|2711
| ½|| style="background:black; color:white" | ½
| ½|| style="background:black; color:white" | 0
| 0|| style="background:black; color:white" | ½
|style="background:lightgray" colspan="2"| 
| 2
| colspan="4" | -
| -
|}

Pool C 
{| class="wikitable"
|-
!Rank
!Player
!RatingMarch 2022
!colspan="2"|WSO
!colspan="2"|SHA
!colspan="2"|PRE
!colspan="2"|MVL
!Total Points
!R1
!R2
!Tiebreak Points
|-
|- align="center" style="background:white; color:black"
| 1|| align="left" |
|2778
| colspan="2" style="background:lightgray" |
|½|| style="background:black; color:white" |½
|½|| style="background:black; color:white" |½
|½|| style="background:black; color:white" |1
| 3.5
| style="background:black; color:white" | 1
| ½
| 1.5
|- align="center" style="background:white; color:black"
| 2|| align="left" |
|2704
| ½|| style="background:black; color:white" |½
|style="background:lightgray" colspan="2"| 
| ½||style="background:black; color:white"|1
| ½|| style="background:black; color:white" |½
| 3.5
| 0
| style="background:black; color:white" | ½
| 0.5
|- align="center" style="background:white; color:black"
| =3|| align="left" |
|2682
|½|| style="background:black; color:white" |½
|0|| style="background:black; color:white" |½
| colspan="2" style="background:lightgray" |
|1|| style="background:black; color:white" |0
| 2.5
| colspan="2" | -
| -
|- align="center" style="background:white; color:black"
| =3|| align="left" |
|2761
|0|| style="background:black; color:white" |½
|½|| style="background:black; color:white" |½
|1|| style="background:black; color:white" |0
| colspan="2" style="background:lightgray" |
| 2.5
| colspan="2" | -
| -
|}

Pool D 
{| class="wikitable"
|-
!Rank
!Player
!RatingMarch 2022
!colspan="2"|TAB
!colspan="2"|VIT
!colspan="2"|YAN
!colspan="2"|GIR
!Total Points
|-
|- align="center" style="background:white; color:black"
| 1||align="left"|
|2623
|style="background:lightgray" colspan="2"| 
| 1|| style="background:black; color:white" |0
|½||style="background:black; color:white"|½
|½||style="background:black; color:white"|1
|3.5
|- align="center" style="background:white; color:black"
| =2||align="left"|
|2726
|1||style="background:black; color:white"| 0
|style="background:lightgray" colspan="2"| 
|½||style="background:black; color:white"|½
| ½||style="background:black; color:white"|½
|3
|- align="center" style="background:white; color:black"
| =2|| align="left" |
|2713
| ½||style="background:black; color:white"|½
|½||style="background:black; color:white"|½ 
|style="background:lightgray" colspan="2"| 
|½||style="background:black; color:white"| ½
|3
|- align="center" style="background:white; color:black"
| 4|| align="left" |
|2771
|0||style="background:black; color:white"|½
|½||style="background:black; color:white"|½
| ½|| style="background:black; color:white" |½
|style="background:lightgray" colspan="2"| 
|2.5
|}

Knockout stage

Semi-final 1
{| class="wikitable"
!Seed!!Name!!March 2022 rating!!1!!2
!R1
!R2!!Total Points
|- align=center
| 10
| align=left | 
| 2750
| style="background:white; color:black" | ½
| style="background:black; color:white" | ½
| style="background:white; color:black" | 1
| style="background:black; color:white" | 1
|3
|- align=center
| 5
| align=left | 
| 2776
| style="background:black; color:white" | ½
| style="background:white; color:black" | ½
| style="background:black; color:white" | 0
| style="background:white; color:black" | 0
|1
|}

Semi-final 2
{| class="wikitable"
!Seed!!Name!!March 2022 rating!!1!!2
!R1
!R2!!Total Points
|- align=center
| 4
| align=left | 
| 2778
| style="background:white; color:black" | 1
| style="background:black; color:white" | 0
| style="background:black; color:white" | 1
| style="background:white; color:black" | 1
| 3
|- align=center
| 23
| align=left | 
| 2623
| style="background:black; color:white" | 0
| style="background:white; color:black" | 1
| style="background:white; color:black" | 0
| style="background:black; color:white" | 0
| 1
|}

Final
{| class="wikitable"
!Seed!!Name!!March 2022 rating!!1!!2
!R1
!R2!!Total Points
|- align=center
| 10
| align=left | 
| 2750
| style="background:black; color:white" | ½
| style="background:white; color:black" | ½
| style="background:white; color:black" | ½
| style="background:black; color:white" | 0
| 1.5
|- align=center
| 4
| align=left | 
| 2778
| style="background:white; color:black" | ½
| style="background:black; color:white" | ½
| style="background:black; color:white" | ½
| style="background:white; color:black" | 1
| 2.5
|}

Grand Prix standings
The following table shows the overall Grand Prix standings. The top two players qualified for the Candidates Tournament. Tie-breaks, in order, are as follows: tournament first places (TF), tournament second places (TS), game points in standard time control games (GP), and game wins in standard time control games (GW). If a tie persists, the final tiebreaker is drawing of lots.

After the round-robin stage of the third tournament, the top two were confirmed to be Richárd Rapport and Hikaru Nakamura as no other player could score 20 or more Grand Prix points.  During the semi-final stage, Nakamura overtook Rapport's score, securing the overall victory.

Notes

References

FIDE Grand Prix
2022 in chess
2022 in German sport
2022 in Serbian sport
February 2022 sports events in Germany
March 2022 sports events in Serbia
March 2022 sports events in Germany
April 2022 sports events in Germany
Sports events affected by the 2022 Russian invasion of Ukraine